XIII Turkmenistan President’s Cup (2007)

Matches played at Nisa Stadium and Olympic Stadium, Ashgabat.

NB: From the Group A, the winners proceed to the final, the runners-up to the third place match. The winners of Group B and C play each other for the spot in the final. The losers play for the third place.

Group A

Group B

NB: The final places were drawn.

Group C

Play-off for the Final

Third-place play-off

Final

The 2007 Turkmenistan President’s Cup Final was played at Olympic Stadium, Ashgabat.

 

2007
President's Cup
2006–07 in Ukrainian football
2006–07 in Iranian football
2007 in Armenian football
2007 in Kazakhstani football
2007 in Thai football
2006–07 in Turkish football
2007 in Tajikistani football